The Janus Mirror is the second full-length album from Brooklyn-based symphonic rock band Emanuel and the Fear and was released via Haldern Pop in September 2012.

Inspiration
The band has stated the record is about change. "It deals with the over-filled human experience in today's silicone world… [it's] our eyes, it is the point between the world outside and the world in our minds," says lead singer Emanuel Ayvas, who has also said he was inspired by a  "vision of a two-headed monster."

Track listing

 "The Janus Mirror" 4:15
 "Samuel" 5:05
 "Grey Eyes" 3:51
 "Wooble" 7:01
 "Foothills of a Fire" 6:10
 "Black Eyes" 4:06
 "My Oh My" 5:40
 "All We All" 5:08
 "Vampires" (live) - Japanese Edition bonus track
 "Ariel and the River" (live) - Japanese Edition bonus track

References

2012 albums
Emanuel and the Fear albums